Tom Cassese (born April 7, 1946) is a former American football defensive back and halfback. He played for the Denver Broncos in 1967 and for the Montreal Alouettes in 1969.

References

1946 births
Living people
American football defensive backs
American football halfbacks
LIU Post Pioneers football players
Denver Broncos players
Montreal Alouettes players